Fu Tei Tsuen is a village in the Fu Tei area of Tuen Mun District, Hong Kong. It comprises the two hamlets of Fu Tei Ha Tsuen and Fu Tei Sheung Tsuen.

Administration
Fu Tei Tsuen is a recognized village under the New Territories Small House Policy. It is one of the 36 villages represented within the Tuen Mun Rural Committee. For electoral purposes, Fu Tei Tsuen is part of the Fu Tai constituency.

References

External links

 Delineation of area of existing village Fu Tei Tsuen (Tuen Mun) for election of resident representative (2019 to 2022)

Villages in Tuen Mun District, Hong Kong
Fu Tei